Hijmans is a Dutch surname, which refers to:

 Alex Hijmans (born 1975), Irish writer
 Abraham Albert Hijmans van den Bergh (1869–1943), physician specializing in internal medicine
  (1890–1987), Dutch writer, engineer, and organisation adviser

See also
 Heyman
 Heymann
 Heymans
 Heiman
 Hyman

Dutch-language surnames